The Norris–La Guardia Act (also known as the Anti-Injunction Bill) is a 1932 United States federal law relating to United States labor law. It banned yellow-dog contracts, barred the federal courts from issuing injunctions against nonviolent labor disputes, and created a positive right of noninterference by employers against workers joining trade unions. The common title comes from the names of the sponsors of the legislation: Senator George W. Norris of Nebraska and Representative Fiorello H. La Guardia of New York, both Republicans.

History
In the 1917 United States Supreme Court case Hitchman Coal & Coke Co. v. Mitchell,  245 U.S. 229 (1917), the court established the Hitchman doctrine, which held that yellow-dog contracts were enforceable. In the aftermath of that case, the number of judicial injunctions against labor increased substantially, and organizing a union without the employer's consent became extremely difficult.

The law is formally the Act of March 23, 1932 (Ch. 90).

Overview 
The Act states that yellow-dog contracts, where workers agree as a condition of employment not to join a labor union, are unenforceable in federal court. It also establishes that employees are free to form unions without employer interference and prevents the federal courts from issuing injunctions in nonviolent labor disputes. The three provisions include protecting worker's self-organization and liberty or "collective bargaining", removing jurisdiction from federal courts vis-a-vis the issuance of injunctions in non-violent labor disputes, and outlawing the "yellow-dog" contract.

Section 13A of the act was fully applied by the Supreme Court of the United States with a 1938 decision, New Negro Alliance v. Sanitary Grocery Co., in an opinion authored by Justice Owen Roberts. The Court held that the act meant to prohibit employers from proscribing the peaceful dissemination of information concerning the terms and conditions of employment by those involved in an active labor dispute, even when such dissemination occurs on an employer's private property.

In popular culture 
The Living Theater play Injunction Granted features a scene in which a judge grants injunctions against many trade unions. There follows a scene in which the Norris - La Guardia Act is passed.

See also
 United States labor law

Notes

External links 
 As codified in 29 U.S.C. chapter 6 of the United States Code from LII
 As codified in 29 U.S.C. chapter 6 of the United States Code from the US House of Representatives
 Norris-LaGuardia Act as amended (PDF/details) in the GPO Statute Compilations collection
 New Negro Alliance v. Sanitary Grocery Co.
 Paul F. Kelly, The Norris-LaGuardia Act: The LMRA's Older Cousin

1932 in American law
72nd United States Congress
United States federal labor legislation
United States federal legislation articles without infoboxes